Major general Alexander Cosby Jackson (1773–1827) was the 11th General Officer Commanding, Ceylon. He was appointed in 1812. He was succeeded by Edward Barnes.

References

General Officers Commanding, Ceylon
19th-century British Army personnel
1773 births
1827 deaths
British Army major generals
Royal Berkshire Regiment officers
40th Regiment of Foot officers
Military personnel from Mumbai
British people in colonial India